Wake One Entertainment (stylised as WAKEONE), is a South Korean entertainment company under CJ ENM. Current artists include Davichi, Roy Kim, Ha Hyun-sang, Jo Yu-ri, TO1 and Kep1er (co-managed with Swing Entertainment) as well as dance crew Mbitious.

History
The company was founded in 2014 by Son Dong-hoon under the name MMO Entertainment (MMO standing for Music Makes One, the slogan of CJ ENM's flagship music channel Mnet).

In September 2018, MMO and CJ ENM founded Off the Record Entertainment to manage Iz*One (now disbanded) and Fromis 9. Pledis Entertainment was involved in the creative direction and music production of both while they were in Off the Record until Pledis CEO withdrew from being involved with IZ*ONE after April 2020 (Fromis 9 continued to be in the label until they fully transferred to Pledis in August 2021). Iz*One and Fromis 9 are debut groups of Mnet's girl group survival shows Produce 48 and Idol School, respectively.

In March 2020, the company name was changed to Onefect Entertainment.

In May 2021, CJ ENM launched 'Wake One'. 
In August 2021, CJ ENM officially launched the label with integrating their in-house production and management labels Stone Music Entertainment, One Effect Entertainment, Studio Blue, and Off the Record. In the same months, Stone Music and Off Record co-managed artists Fromis 9 were transferred 
to Pledis Entertainment.

Following the terminated management contract with n.CH Entertainment by CJ ENM in early 2021, TO1 were transferred to Wake One Entertainment in May 2021 (after the company reorganization in the same month).

On October 25, 2021, it was announced that Wake One Entertainment would co-manage the winner of the Girls Planet 999 group, Kep1er, with sister company Swing Entertainment.  The group's contract will last for two years and six months.

In December 2021, former RBW composer and producer Park Woo-sang transferred to the label.

Artists

Groups
Davichi
Kep1er (co-managed with Swing Entertainment)
 TO1 (formerly TOO)

Soloists
 Ha Hyun-sang
 Jo Yu-ri
 Roy Kim
 Lim Seul-ong
 Oh Seong-min
 Cha Woong-gi

Producers
 Park Woo-sang

Dance Crew
 Mbitious

Notable trainees
 Kim Chae-hyun (Kep1er)

Former artists
 Hong Dae-kwang (2014–2017)
 Wable (2016–2017)
IN2IT (2017–2020) 
 Jinsub (2017–2018)
 Sunghyun (2017–2019)
Park Bo-ram (2014–2018)
Son Ho-young (2017–2019)
Kim Feel (2016–2020)
 Hoons
Kang Daniel
Yoon Ji-sung
Song Soo-woo (2021–2022)
TO1
Choi Chi-hoon (2020–2022)
Kim Min-su (2020-2022)

Off the Record Entertainment 
 Iz*One (co-managed with Swing Entertainment, 2018–2021, now disbanded)
 Kwon Eun-bi (2018–2021)
 Sakura Miyawaki (2018–2021)
 Kang Hye-won (2018–2021)
 Choi Ye-na (2018–2021)
 Lee Chae-yeon (2018–2021)
 Kim Chae-won (2018–2021)
 Kim Min-ju (2018–2021)
 Nako Yabuki (2018–2021)
 Hitomi Honda (2018–2021)
 An Yu-jin (2018–2021)
 Jang Won-young (2018–2021)

 Fromis 9 (2017–2021, moved to Pledis Entertainment)
 Lee Sae-rom (2017–2021)
 Song Ha-young (2017–2021)
 Jang Gyu-ri (2017–2021)
 Park Ji-won (2017–2021)
 Roh Ji-sun (2017–2021)
 Lee Seo-yeon (2017–2021)
 Lee Chae-young (2017–2021)
 Lee Na-gyung (2017–2021)
 Baek Ji-heon (2017–2021)

Notes

References

External links
     

2014 establishments in South Korea
Record labels established in 2014
K-pop record labels
Soul music record labels
South Korean record labels
Talent agencies of South Korea
CJ E&M Music and Live subsidiaries